Shahin or Shaheen , is a male or female given name which is the generic term for hawk or falcon, although in specific, the peregrine falcon. The name Shaheen/Shahin is a composite of two nouns, "shah" - king and "īn" - which is a sign of proportion, freedom,or "royal", literally "king of the birds"

The name is used in Persian,Urdu ,Kurdish and Turkish speaking countries.

It may refer to:

Shaheen Afridi (born 2000), Pakistani cricketer
Shaheen Ariefdien, South African rapper
Samina Baig (born 1972), Pakistani mountaineer
Shaheen Holloway (born 1976), American college basketball player and coach
Shaheen Khalid Butt, Pakistani politician
Shaheen Mistri (born 1971), Indian social activist and educator
Shaheen Samad (born 1952), Bangladeshi Nazrul Sangeet singer
Shaheen Sehbai, Pakistani-American journalist
Shaheen Sheik (born 1975), American singer-songwriter
Shaheen Jafargholi (born 1997), Welsh singer and actor

Shahin 
Shahin Abdulrahman (born 1992), Emirati footballer
Shahin Afrassiabi (born 1963), Iranian artist
Shahin Akhtar, Bangladesh politician
Shahin Aliaj (born 1996), Albanian footballer
Shahin Assayesh (born 1939), Iranian publisher
Shahin Badar (born 1974), British musician
Shahin Bayani (born 1962), Iranian footballer
Shahin Charmi (born 1953), Iranian-born German artist
Shahin Ebrahimzadeh-Pezeshki (born 1958), Iranian textile artist, art historian
Şahin Giray (prince) (c.1585–1641), exiled member of the ruling house of the Crimean Khanate
Shahin Imranov (born 1980), Azerbaijani boxer
Shahin Khaledan (born 1990), Iranian tennis player
Shahin Kheiri (born 1980), Iranian footballer
Shahin Kolonja, (1865–1919), Albanian journalist and politician
Shahin Musayev, (fl. 1992–1995), Azerbaijani politician and general
Shahin Mustafayev, (born 1965), Azerbaijani politician
Shahin Najafi (born 1980), Iranian musician
Shahin Nassirinia (born 1976), Iranian weightlifter
Shahin Novrasli (born 1977), Azerbaijani musical artist
Shahin Saghebi (born 1993), Iranian footballer
Shahin (Shawn) Shadfar (1973–2018), Persian-American entrepreneur
Shahin Shafiei (born 1988), Iranian footballer
Shahin Shahbazi (born 1978), Iranian composer, musician and poet
Shahin Shahida, Iranian-American musician
Shahin Sultanov, Commander of the Azerbaijani Naval Forces
Shahin Suroor (born 1996), Emirati footballer
Shahin Taherkhani (born 1997), Iranian footballer
Shahin Vahmanzadegan (died c. 626), Sasanian general

Middle name
Aram Shahin Davud Bakoyan (born 1954), Iraqi politician
Kazi Shahin Ara, Bangladeshi national women's kabaddi player
Khalifa Shaheen Al Merri, Emirati diplomat

Surname

Shaheen
Abdel Hamid Shaheen (1943–2014), Egyptian footballer
Adam Shaheen (American football) (born 1994), American football player
Adam Shaheen (producer) (born 1964), British-Canadian artist, television producer and screenwriter
Alfred Shaheen (1922–2008), American textile industrialist
Bob Shaheen (born 1933), American businessman
Elias Shaheen or Elias Chahine (1914–1991), first bishop of the Maronite Church in Canada
Fadi Shaheen (born 1979), Jordanian footballer
Faiza Shaheen (born 1983), British economist and activist
George Shaheen (born 1944), American businessman
Hina Shaheen (born 1971), Pakistani actress
Ibrahim Shaheen, Palestinian man who worked for the Israeli intelligence service Mossad
Jeanne Shaheen (born 1947), American politician
Jack Shaheen (1935–2017), American media scholar
John Shaheen (1915–1985), American financier, and businessman
Matt Shaheen (born 1965), American politician
Mohammad Shaheen, Jordanian professor of English literature
Muhammad Parvesh Shaheen (born 1944), Pakistani historian and author
Musarrat Shaheen, Pakistani actress and politician
Najma Shaheen (born 1962), Pakistani politician
Naseeb Shaheen (1931–2009), American scholar
Natali Shaheen, Palestinian footballer
Qasim Riza Shaheen (born 1971), British artist and writer
Robert Joseph Shaheen (1937–2017), American Maronite bishop
Saif Saaeed Shaheen (born 1982), formerly Stephen Cherono, Kenyan-born Emirati long-distance runner
Sarah Shaheen (born 1983), Egyptian beauty pageant and model
Shaher Shaheen (born 1990), Syrian footballer
Simon Shaheen (born 1955), Palestinian-American composer and musician
Suhail Shaheen, Taliban negotiator and spokesman
Yasser Shaheen (born 1989), Syrian footballer

Shahin
Elham Shahin (born 1961), Egyptian actress
Emad Shahin (born 1957), Egyptian professor of political science
Hady Shahin (born 1986), Egyptian handball player
Iraj Shahin-Baher (born 1972), Iranian politician and mayor of Tabriz
Jammal Shahin (born 1988), English footballer
Khalil Mohamed Shahin (born 1942), Egyptian footballer
Mamdouh Shahin, Egyptian Major General, politician and Assistant Defense Minister
Mohamed Issa Shahin (born 1963), Jordanian sports shooter
Nadine Shahin (born 1997), Egyptian squash player
Omar Shahin, Jordanian activist
Tanyus Shahin (1815–1895), Maronite muleteer and peasant leader from Mount Lebanon
Tarek Shahin (born 1982), Egyptian cartoonist

Chahine
Abdallah Chahine (1894–1975), Lebanese pianist and tuner-technician
Darine Chahine (born 1981), Lebanese talk show host
Edgar Chahine (1874–1947), French painter, engraver and illustrator of Armenian descent
Hassan Chahine, Moroccan hammer thrower
Khalil Chahine, German-Lebanese musical artist
Nadine Chahine, Lebanese type designer
Yehia Chahine (1917–1994), Egyptian actor
Youssef Chahine (1926–2008), Egyptian film director

Military
 Black Shaheen, a variant of the Storm Shadow/SCALP EG air-launched cruise missile
 Shaheen, the military symbol of Pakistan Air Force
Shaheen-I, a short range ballistic missile developed by Pakistan
Shaheen-II, a medium/intermediate range ballistic missile developed by Pakistan
Shaheen-III, a medium/intermediate range ballistic missile developed by Pakistan
Shahin (rocket), an Iranian artillery rocket
Mersad or Shahin, a supersonic Iranian ground-to-air guided missile

Places

Shaheen
Shaheen Bagh, a neighborhood in Delhi

Shahin
Shahin, Iran, a village in Iran
Shahin-e Olya, a village in Iran
Shahin Shahr, a planned satellite city in Iran

Other uses
Shaheen (novel), by Naseem Hijazi
Shaheen (supercomputer), a Cray supercomputer
Shaheen Air, a defunct Pakistani airline
Shaheen Foundation, a Pakistani company
Cyclones Gulab and Shaheen, cyclone originated in Arabian Sea
Shaheen Falcon, a non-migratory subspecies of the Peregrine Falcon
Shahin F.C., an Iranian football club
4103 Chahine, a main-belt asteroid
Al Shaheen Oil Field, a production oil and gas field off the north east coast of Qatar

See also
Şahin (disambiguation), the usual Turkish spelling